Ryan Scott,   (born 3 March 1982) is a Paralympic wheelchair rugby competitor from Australia. In four Paralympics, Scott has won a silver medal at the 2008 Beijing Paralympics and gold medals at the 2012 London and 2016 Rio Paralympics.

Personal
Scott was born on 3 March 1982. On 6 June 1998 as a 16-year-old, he became a quadriplegic due to a car crash on a country road en route to Victor Harbor, South Australia. At the time of the accident, he was a year 11 student at Willunga High School. The accident left Scott paralysed from his chest down but he has some movement in his shoulders, back, biceps and forearms. He moved to Brisbane from Adelaide in 2009 due to the warm weather and due to Queensland having a good wheelchair rugby program.

Wheelchair rugby

Scott took up wheelchair rugby as part of his rehabilitation. Scott said "I always loved sport and participated in all kinds of sport – soccer, basketball, Aussie rules, pretty much every sport except able-bodied rugby. As a quadriplegic, I didn’t have the upper-body strength to play wheelchair basketball. When I saw wheelchair rugby, that’s when I thought that sport was still possible." Scott made his debut for the Australian team 'Steelers' in August 2001. He was a member of the Steelers that came fifth at the 2004 Athens Paralympics. He won a silver medal at the 2008 Beijing Games in the mixed wheelchair rugby event. He won a gold medal at the 2012 London Games in the mixed wheelchair rugby event.

He was a member of the Steelers that finished with the silver medal at the 2010 World Championships and gold medal at the 2014 World Wheelchair Rugby Championships at Odense, Denmark.

Scott captained the Australian team that retained its gold medal at the 2016 Rio Paralympics after defeating the United States 59–58 in the final.

At the 2018 World Championships in Sydney, he was a member of the Australian team that won the silver medal after being defeated by Japan 61–62 in the gold medal game.

During his career he was co-captain and captain of the Steelers (2012–2016) and played for the Suncorp Queensland Cyclones in the Wheelchair Rugby National League.

Scott said "because of wheelchair rugby I’ve been able to travel the world playing a team sport, I have represented my county at three Paralympic Games, which is huge. It has also made me a much more independent person."

In September 2018, after 288 Steelers games, he announced his retirement from international wheelchair rugby.

Recognition
2012 - Order of Australia (OAM) - for service to sport as a gold medallist at the London 2012 Paralympic Games.
2015 - Sporting Wheelie of the Year - Sporting Wheelies and Disabled Association
2016 - Senior Male Athlete of the Year - Sporting Wheelies and Disabled Association with Chris Bond.

References

External links

Paralympic wheelchair rugby players of Australia
Wheelchair rugby players at the 2004 Summer Paralympics
Wheelchair rugby players at the 2008 Summer Paralympics
Wheelchair rugby players at the 2012 Summer Paralympics
Wheelchair rugby players at the 2016 Summer Paralympics
Paralympic gold medalists for Australia
Paralympic silver medalists for Australia
Living people
1982 births
Recipients of the Medal of the Order of Australia
People with tetraplegia
Medalists at the 2008 Summer Paralympics
Medalists at the 2012 Summer Paralympics
Medalists at the 2016 Summer Paralympics
Paralympic medalists in wheelchair rugby